Daan Roosegaarde (born 1979) is a Dutch artist, pioneer and founder of Studio Roosegaarde, which develops projects that merge technology and art in urban environments. Some of the studio's works have been described as "immersive" and "interactive" because they change the visitors' surroundings in reaction to the behavior of those visitors. Other works are intended to increase environmental awareness and to add an aesthetic dimension that complements the technical solutions to environmental problems.

Early life and education  
Roosegaarde was born in 1979 in Nieuwkoop in The Netherlands. He studied at the Institute for the Arts in Arnhem (1997–1999), the AKI Academy for Art & Design in Enschede (2001–2003), and the Berlage Institute in Rotterdam (2003–2005).

Overview 

Roosegaarde's projects often employ light design and sensing technology in an interactive manner, as illustrated in an early work, 4D-PIXEL, a "smart wall" that physically reacts to voice and music and shows 3D letters, created with his team at AKI Enschede and Saxion Enschede with KITT Engineering. In 2007, he founded Studio Roosegaarde, in Rotterdam, The Netherlands. The Studio is a social design lab, also called “The Dream Factory”. Later he opened a "pop-up" studio in Shanghai, China. There is permanent ancillary studio in Dubai.

The work of Studio Roosegaarde ranges from design installations that address sustainable energy solutions for the future to sensor-driven, touch-responsive interactive installations and community art projects. The studio's work explores the Dutch concept of Schoonheid, meaning "beauty", but also invoking "cleanliness" in reference to air, water and energy sources.

Environmental art 

From 2015 to 2017, Roosegaarde's studio created two environmental art projects, the "Smog Free Project" used art to clean the environment and the "Icoon Afsluitdijk Project" created immersive art on an existing dyke.

Smog Free Project (2015): In response to record 2013 air pollution in Beijing, Roosegaarde proposed the "Smog Free Project" with the following elements:

 Smog Free Tower: An aesthetically designed 7-metre (23 ft) smog tower to filter pollution—processing 30,000 cubic metres per hour (39,000 cuyd/h) of air, using 1,400 Watts of power—and collects the impurities to be converted into jewellery. 
 Smog Free Bicycle: Mounts filters on bicycles to collect air impurities as each bike travels. The design of the prototype was inspired by the manta ray, which filters water for food. 
 Smog Free Rings: Designed as rewards to kickstarter supporters.

Icoon Afsluitdijk (2017): A design programme commissioned by the Dutch Government comprising three installations on the 32-kilometre Afsluitdijk dyke, built in 1932.
Gates of Light: An installation sited on the dyke's floodgates, employs prisms that reflect light from vehicle headlights. 
Windvogel: Incorporates kites that generate wind power by moving their cable tethers, each of which is luminous and glows in the dark.
Glowing Nature: Features live bioluminescent algae; single-celled organisms that emit light when under foot.

DreamScape series 

Four "DreamScapes" that combine art and landscape are Urban Sun, GROW, Seeing Stars and SPARK. 
 Urban Sun (2019-2021): Urban Sun employs far-ultraviolet light to remove a claimed 99.9% of airborne COVID and other viruses, employing research by Columbia University and Hiroshima University, while meeting international safety standards.
 GROW (2021): Grow is an installation of fibre-optic LED grow lights  a field of leeks, which emit aesthetically pleasing blue, red, and ultraviolet (UV) light, with the claim that it enhances plant growth, while reducing the use of pesticides by up to 50% and using solar-power.
 Seeing Stars (2021): In partnership with Unesco Netherlands and the city of Franeker, this project was a coordinated one-night blackout of the city, intended to enhance a sense of shared community connection with the sky.
 SPARK (2022): First demonstrated in Bilbao, SPARK uses biodegradable bubbles and lights as a sustainable alternative to fireworks in a 50 x 30 x 50 metre cloud.

Other works 

Other works by the studio include:

Liquid Space (2006): An installation that reacts to the presence of visitors using sensors, software and mechanisms to change the appearance of the space through lighting effects.
FLOW (2007): A 10-metre-wide corridor of ventilator fans controlled by sensors, which reacted to the sound and motion of visitors passing through them, while on display in Ljubljana, Slovenia.
DUNE (2007): A 60-metre installation along the Maas River in Rotterdam that uses fiberoptic lighting that changes color and intensity, according to the sounds of passersby, while using less than 60 watts of power.
Space Waste Lab (2008): A continuing conceptual project to enhance awareness of space debris from spent satellites and missiles, using beams of light and to create artificial meteors from the capture waste.
Intimacy (2010): A project to design garments that reacted to changes in heat produced by people present or by the environment. The heat changed the opacity of the garment "e-foil" material, based on sensor input. The e-foil material was produced in black and white versions.
LOTUS (2010-2021): A series of artworks, employing a back-lit surface that opens and closes like a lotus in response to visitors' interactions with the surface. Shapes include: LOTUS DOME displayed in Sainte Marie Madeleine Church in Lille, France, LOTUS OCULUS was exhibited during the 2021 Salone del Mobile in Milan, and LOTUS Maffei, permanently displayed in the Palazzo Maffei Museum in Verona, Italy.

Smart Highway (2014): A lighting project, in collaboration with the Heijmans infrastructure group to use light, which uses stored solar energy to illuminate highway delineations with glowing lines.
Van Gogh Path (2012-2015): A 600-metre (2,000 ft) bicycle path between Nuenen and Eindhoven, which uses thousands lights that charge during the day and twinkle at night—inspired by Vincent van Gogh's painting, The Starry Night.
Beyond (2016): A lenticular print of cloud images 121-metre (397 ft) long and back-lit by LED lamps at Amsterdam's Schiphol Airport, which gives the illusion of depth into the image.

Rainbow Station (2016): A lighting project, in collaboration with Leiden University, which illuminates the 125-year-old Amsterdam Central Station.
WATERLICHT (2016-2021): A light display that uses LEDs and lenses to create a wave-like moving layer of blue light above the heads of spectators to evoke thoughts about rising sea levels and the need to adapt to the changing environment. The display was shown in Amsterdam in 2016 for the Dutch District Water Board, and later in London, Toronto, Paris, Rotterdam, Dubai, New York City and Slot Loevestein.
PRESENCE (2017): An 800-metre2 "immersive" installation in the Groninger Museum that uses hidden lights to illuminate a series of spaces, starting with a grid-like view of Holland from above, a Mondrian grid, where the room seems to scan the visitor with light, passing next into a second empty space, where sudden lights imprint the visitor on the wall, followed by a space occupied by luminescent balls on the floor and ending in a space with images of an intern, who helped create the fluorescent effect, on the floor, invoking both primitive and futuristic sensations.
SYNC (2019): An "immersive" art installation wherein visitors create blue light rings around where they are walking on a flexible-membrane floor.
Levenslicht (2020): An installation of 104,000 luminescent memorial stones representing each of the Dutch victims of the Holocaust.  It was commissioned by the National Committee for 4 and 5 May and exhibited in Rotterdam on the banks of the Maas River, where the victims of Rotterdam were assembled to be deported. Subsequently, the work was divided among 170 municipalities with a Holocaust history.
 TOUCH (2021): An installation developed for the museum Draiflessen Museum collection in Mettingen, Germany, that senses when two visitors join hands and generates thousands of starry lights.

Permanent public artworks 
The following public artworks are located in the Netherlands;
 22 Beds, Enschede (2002)
 Spiral, Velp (2003)
 Lunar, Breda (2011)
 Marbles, Almere (2012)
 Van Gogh Path, Eindhoven/Nuenen (2012)
 Beyond, Schiphol Airport (2016)
 Space, Eindhoven Central Station (2017)

Exhibitions 
Studio Roosegaarde has exhibited at the Rijksmuseum, Stedelijk Museum Amsterdam, Tate Modern, Tokyo National Museum, Victoria and Albert Museum, the Musee des Arts Decoratifs in Paris, Google Zeitgeist, and the Design Museum in London.

Awards & recognition 
Roosegaarde has received notable awards for his work including the Shenzhen Global Design Award, Ethics Ethical Award, LIT Lighting Design Award 2019, World OMOSIROI Award Japan, Beijing Media Architecture Award, Design Project of the Year Dezeen Award, London Design Innovation medal in 2016, the INDEX Design Award, DFA Gold and Grand Award Hong Kong, LIT 2017 Lighting Designer of the Year Award, Platinum A’Design Award 2017, D&AD Awards 2017, Core77 Design Awards 2017, Dutch Artist of the Year 2016, the World Technology Award, 2020 Winner [d]arc awards 2020 Art – High: Grow, Netherlands by Studio Roosegaarde, 2021 Winner Global Future Design Awards, 2021 Finalist World Changing Ideas Awards 2021, Urban Design finalists, and the 2021 Winner Media Architecture Awards, Spatial Media Art.

Bibliography
 Adele Chong, Timo de Rijk, Daan Roosegaarde: Interactive Landscapes, nai010, Rotterdam, 2011.  
 Carol Becker, Nico Daswani, Fumio Nanjo, Daan Roosegaarde, Phaidon, London, 2019.

References

External links 

 Studio Roosegaarde official website
 Article in Impact Mania on Roosegaarde
 Artsy article on Roosegaarde
 New York Times article on Roosegaarde

1979 births
Living people
People from Nieuwkoop
Articles containing video clips
Dutch contemporary artists